Klossowski is a surname, and may refer to:

 Balthazar Klossowski de Rola, the French painter Balthus
Erich Klossowski
Madame Klossowski, Loulou de la Falaise - ex-wife of Thadée Klossowski de Rola, the youngest son of Balthus
Pierre Klossowski